The Bull Riding Hall of Fame, located at Cowtown Coliseum in the Fort Worth Stockyards in Fort Worth, Texas, United States, is a hall of fame for the sport of bull riding. It is incorporated as a non-profit organization in the State of Texas, and created to "recognize, memorialize, and applaud the bull riders, bullfighters, bulls, stock contractors, events, and individuals who have made a historic contribution and attained stellar performance in the sport."  Membership is open to fans worldwide.

The Bull Riding Hall of Fame intends to honor all of the bull riding champions.  But the hall also has other goals to preserve the history of bull riding, housing "inductee exhibits, accomplishments, photos, videos, personal effects and much more". The Bull Riding Hall of Fame has four categories of induction: Bull Riders, Bull Fighters, Bulls, and Legends.

The inaugural class of inductions started in 2015. The hall opened its doors to the public in 2016.

History
The founders created the Bull Riding Hall of Fame, Inc., "to recognize bull riders, bull fighters, bulls, organizations, competitive events, and stock contractors that have achieved the ultimate level of performance in the sport of bull riding." The organization's activities include historical presentation, visitor education, event hosting, and managing via multiple committees.

The founders were involved in overseeing the building of the foundation hall, and also maintaining the Bull Riding Hall of Fame museum at Cowtown Coliseum in Fort Worth. Husband and wife team, Bill and Tammi Putnam, were co-founders and respectively served as president and treasurer, as well as the Board of Directors.  Bill Putnam's daughter, Amy Ellinger, served as secretary.

Organization

The Bull Riding Hall of Fame Museum is located at Cowtown Coliseum, Fort Worth Stockyards, Fort Worth, Texas.

One class of nominees is inducted into the hall each year. Inductees are selected by the nominations and votes of Members, which includes Inductees. Annual and Lifetime memberships along with Gold Rowel Partnerships are available for individuals, couples, companies and organizations.  Sponsors can be an individual, couple, organization, or corporation.

From 2015 to 2019, the annual induction ceremony was held at Cowtown Coliseum. Since 2020, it has been held at Billy Bob's Texas.

List of Inductees 

The Bull Riding Hall of Fame has inducted individuals from the Professional Rodeo Cowboys Association (PRCA), International Professional Rodeo Association (IPRA), and Professional Bull Riders (PBR).

The inductees, human and animal, are among the most notable individuals and organizations in the sport.

More than half of them are also inductees of the ProRodeo Hall of Fame, including bullfighter Wick Peth. Others include PRCA bull rider Lane Frost, famous for his duel with Red Rock in the Challenge of the Champions.

From the Professional Bull Riders (PBR) there are several Ring of Honor holders from the Heroes and Legends Celebration which is the PBR equivalent of a Hall of Fame. Chris Shivers, a holder of several records in the PBR and a 2013 Ring of Honor holder. Another Ring of Honor holder is bull rider Tuff Hedeman, one of the riders who conquered Bodacious. Hedeman competed in the PRCA and the PBR. He is also in the ProRodeo Hall of Fame.

Out of the three bulls that have been inducted , two of them are also in the ProRodeo Hall of Fame. Tornado was inducted in 1979. Bodacious was inducted in 1999. Bodacious was the only bull to win the PRCA Bucking Bull of the Year and the PBR World Champion Bull titles in 1995, until Bruiser did it in 2017.

2015 Inaugural Inductees 

Source:

2016 Inductees 

Source:

2017 Inductees 

Source:

2018 Inductees 

Source:

2019 Inductees 

Source:

2020 Inductees 

Source:

2021 Inductees 

Source:

2022 Inductees 

Source:

See also
 Lists of rodeo performers
 List of ProRodeo Hall of Fame inductees
 Professional Bull Riders
 Professional Rodeo Cowboys Association
 ProRodeo Hall of Fame
 Rodeo Hall of Fame

References

External links
 Official Site
 The Bull Riding Hall Fame Facebook Page
 The Bull Riding Hall of Fame Official YouTube video

Cowboy halls of fame
Sports halls of fame
Halls of fame in Texas
Museums in Fort Worth, Texas
American West museums in Texas
Sports museums in Texas
Museums established in 2012
2012 establishments in Texas
Rodeo champions
Lists of sports awards
Bull riding